The Beaumont and Fletcher folios are two large folio collections of the stage plays of John Fletcher and his collaborators. The first was issued in 1647, and the second in 1679. The two collections were important in preserving many works of English Renaissance drama.

The first folio, 1647
The 1647 folio was published by the booksellers Humphrey Moseley and Humphrey Robinson. It was modelled on the precedents of the first two folio collections of Shakespeare's plays, published in 1623 and 1632, and the first two folios of the works of Ben Jonson of 1616 and 1640–1. The title of the book was given as Comedies and Tragedies Written by Francis Beaumont and John Fletcher Gentlemen, though the prefatory matter in the folio recognised that Philip Massinger, rather than Francis Beaumont, collaborated with Fletcher on some of the plays included in the volume. (In fact, the 1647 volume "contained almost nothing of Beaumont's" work.) Seventeen works in Fletcher's canon that had already been published prior to 1647, and the rights to these plays belonged to the stationers who had issued those volumes; Robinson and Moseley therefore concentrated on the previously unpublished plays in the Fletcher canon.

Most of these plays had been acted onstage by the King's Men, the troupe of actors for whom Fletcher had functioned as house dramatist for most of his career. The folio featured a dedication to Philip Herbert, 4th Earl of Pembroke, signed by ten of the King's Men – John Lowin, Joseph Taylor, Richard Robinson, Robert Benfield, Eliard Swanston, Thomas Pollard, Hugh Clark, William Allen, Stephen Hammerton, and Theophilus Bird – all idled by the closing of the theatres in 1642. It also contained two addresses to the reader, by James Shirley and by Moseley, and 37 commendatory poems, long and short, by figures famous and obscure, including Shirley, Ben Jonson, Richard Lovelace, Robert Herrick, Richard Brome, Jasper Mayne, Thomas Stanley, and Sir Aston Cockayne.

The 1647 folio contains 35 works – 34 plays and 1 masque.

The 1647 folio has attracted significant attention from scholars and bibliographers, and various specialised studies of the folio (books on the book) have been written. As with Shakespeare's First Folio, the typesetting of individual compositors and the work of individual printers has been traced and analysed – including that of Susan Islip, one of the rare instances of a female printer in the 17th century.

The second folio, 1679
The second folio, titled Fifty Comedies and Tragedies, was published by the booksellers Henry Herringman, John Martyn, and Richard Marriot; the printing was done by J. Macock. The three stationers had obtained the rights to previously-published works, and added 18 dramas to the 35 of the first folio, for a total of 53. The second folio added features that the first lacked. Many songs in the plays were given in full. Cast lists were prefixed to 25 of the dramas, lists that provide the names of the leading actors in the original productions of the plays. These lists can be informative on the companies involved and the dates of first productions; the cast list prefixed to The Honest Man's Fortune, for example, reveals that the play was originally staged by the Lady Elizabeth's Men in the 1612–13 period.

On the negative side, the texts in the second folio were set into type from the previously-printed quarto texts, and never from manuscript; the texts of the plays in the first collection were printed from manuscript sources.

Content, authorship, and canon

The implicit canon, nearly realized by the contents of the second folio, comprises dramatic works written by Beaumont or Fletcher; either alone, together, or in collaboration with other playwrights. By this rule, likely, four plays should be excluded (The Laws of Candy by John Ford, Wit at Several Weapons by Middleton and Rowley, The Nice Valour by Middleton, and The Coronation by James Shirley), and three more extant plays should be included (John van Olden Barnavelt, A Very Woman, and Henry VIII). A Very Woman was printed in a volume of Massinger's plays in 1655, while John van Olden Barnavelt remained in manuscript until the 19th century. Henry VIII was first published in the Shakespeare First Folio of 1623.

At least five plays, no longer extant, may also belong in the canon. Four of these were entered to Moseley in the Stationers' Register between 1653 and 1660, possibly with the intent of printing them in the second folio: Cardenio (Shakespeare and Fletcher?), A Right Woman (Beaumont and Fletcher?), The Wandering Lovers (Fletcher?), and The Jeweler of Amsterdam (Fletcher, Field, and Massinger?). A fifth non-extant play, The Queen was questionably attributed to Fletcher by a contemporary.

The folios contain two works that are generally thought to be the work of Beaumont alone – The Knight of the Burning Pestle and The Masque of the Inner Temple and Gray's Inn – and fifteen that are solo efforts by Fletcher, and perhaps a dozen that are actual Beaumont/Fletcher collaborations. The rest are Fletcher's collaborations with Massinger and other writers.

Notes
 1st Act — Year the play was first acted. Dates are approximate and, unless otherwise noted, follow Gurr.
 1st Pub — Year of first publication as given by Glover & Waller, unless otherwise noted.
 Authorial attributions — Though there is general consensus, scholars still debate the exact contributions of authors. Unless otherwise noted, attributions are those of Cyrus Hoy.

Later editions
The folios limited but did not extinguish the market for individual editions of the plays; such editions were printed when the chances for profit seemed favourable. Humphrey Robinson and Alice Moseley (Humphrey Moseley's widow) issued a quarto of Beggar's Bush in 1661, for example. During the Restoration era and into the 18th century, the plays in the Beaumont/Fletcher canon were very popular – though they were often performed in adapted versions rather than in the originals; and the adaptations then appeared in print. An adaptation of The Island Princess was published in 1669; and adapted version of Monsieur Thomas was printed in 1678.  Beggar's Bush became The Royal Merchant, published in 1706 – and later, The Merchant of Bruges. This trend in favour of new adaptations over original versions made it easier for Herringman, Martyn, and Mariot to obtain permissions to reprint those originals in their 1679 collection.

See also
1647 in literature

Notes

Sources

External links
 First Folio of 1647 at Internet Archive
 

1647 books
1679 books
English Renaissance plays
English dramatists and playwrights
Bibliography
Publishing